Jonathan Eysseric and Jérôme Inzerillo were the defending champions, but did not compete in the Juniors in 2008.

Nikolaus Moser and Cedrik-Marcel Stebe won in the final 7–6(7–5), 3–6, 10–8, against Henri Kontinen and Christopher Rungkat.

Seeds

Draw

Finals

Top half

Bottom half

External links
Draw

Boys' Doubles
US Open, 2008 Boys' Doubles